Simon Finlay Wells (born 1961) is an English film director of animation and live-action films. He is the great-grandson of author H. G. Wells, and is best known for directing The Prince of Egypt with Brenda Chapman and Steve Hickner.

Early life and education
Born in Cambridge, he attended The Perse School and De Montfort University where he studied audio-visual design. Upon graduating he found a job at Richard Williams's studio where he animated commercials and other projects. Wells later supervised the animation on Who Framed Roger Rabbit.

Career
Wells began his film career by joining Richard Williams Animation, where he served as a supervising animator on Who Framed Roger Rabbit. After the closing of Richard Williams Animation, Wells became a member of Amblimation, a studio owned by Steven Spielberg, where he served as director on their only three films: An American Tail: Fievel Goes West, We're Back! A Dinosaur's Story and Balto. Wells was set to direct a sequel to Casper, but the project was cancelled.

After the closing of Amblimation, Wells joined DreamWorks where he worked as storyboard artist on many animated projects, and also directed The Prince of Egypt which was nominated for an Annie Award.

In 2002, Wells directed his first live-action film, a film adaptation of his great-grandfather's book The Time Machine.

Wells went back to DreamWorks Animation, where he continued as a story artist for films such as Spirit: Stallion of the Cimarron (2002), Shrek 2 (2004), Madagascar (2005) and Flushed Away (2006).

In 2011 he co-wrote and directed Mars Needs Moms using motion-capture technology during the filming.

Filmography
Director
 An American Tail: Fievel Goes West (1991)
 We're Back! A Dinosaur's Story (1993)
 Balto (1995)
 The Prince of Egypt (1998)
 The Time Machine (2002)
 Mars Needs Moms (2011) (Also writer)

Story artist
 Spirit: Stallion of the Cimarron (2002)
 Sinbad: Legend of the Seven Seas (2003)
 Madagascar (2005)
 Over the Hedge (2006)
 Flushed Away (2006)
 Shrek the Third (2007)
 Kung Fu Panda (2008)
 The Croods (2013)
 Kung Fu Panda 3 (2016)
 The Lego Ninjago Movie (2017)
 The Croods: A New Age (2020)
 Puss In Boots: The Last Wish (2022)

Additional story artist
 Antz (1998)
 The Road to El Dorado (2000)
 Chicken Run (2000)
 Shrek 2 (2004)
 Shark Tale (2004)
 Kung Fu Panda 2 (2011)
 How to Train Your Dragon: The Hidden World (2019)

Other credits

References

External links
 

Alumni of De Montfort University
English animators
English film directors
British animated film directors
1961 births
People educated at The Perse School
People from Cambridge
Living people
Place of birth missing (living people)
British storyboard artists
DreamWorks Animation people
Simon